Ronnie Harrell Jr. (born March 11, 1996) is an American basketball player for Ironi Ness Ziona of the Israeli Basketball Premier League. He plays the guard and forward positions. He played college basketball for Creighton University and the University of Denver.

Early life
His parents are Ronnie and Shawn Harrell, and Tiffany Peterson, and he has eight siblings. Harrell is a cousin of former NBA guard and current coach Chauncey Billups. His nickname is "Slim". His hometown is Denver, Colorado. Growing up, he was a Denver Nuggets ball boy. He is 6" 7" (201 cm), and weighs 200 pounds (91 kg).

High school career
Harrell attended Denver East High School, where he played for the basketball team. He was 5' 8" as a high school freshman, but grew seven inches that summer, then grew another three inches after his sophomore year. As a junior, he averaged 13 points, 7.3 rebounds, and 2.1 steals per game.

As a senior, Harrell averaged 16.5 points, 8.0 rebounds, and 2.3 assists per game.  He made 154 three-pointers in three seasons while shooting 39.6% from beyond the arc.  He was named to the All-5A State Tournament Team as a senior, was a Denver Post All-Colorado selection, was ranked No. 71 on ESPN’s list of Top 100 recruits and a four-star recruit, and was ranked a three-star recruit by both Scout and Rivals.

College career
Harrell first attended Creighton University, where he majored in journalism and played guard and forward for the Creighton Bluejays men's basketball team. He sat out the 2014–15 season as a redshirt. In 2015–16 he was a redshirt freshman, and averaged 3.2 points, 2.6 rebounds, and 1.0 assists per game off the bench.
In 2016–17 as a sophomore, off the bench he averaged 2.6 points and 1.9 rebounds per game. In 2017–18 as a junior he averaged 6.2 points, 6.6 rebounds, and 2.9 assists per game as a starter, and 7.6 points, 5.9 rebounds, and 2.4 assists per game off the bench.

Harrell graduated and transferred to Denver for his senior season. In 2018–19, playing for the Pioneers he averaged 12.9 points (tied for 16th in the Summit League), 5.5 rebounds (12th), and 2.0 assists per game, with 189 defensive rebounds (10th), while shooting 40.9% from the field, 36.8% from the three point line, and 79.7% from the free-throw line (6th). He was named to the Summit League Preseason All-Newcomer Team and the Summit League All-Newcomer Team.

Professional career
Harrell played in 2019–20 for Steaua in the Romanian Liga Națională and for Etzella in the Luxembourg Total League.  He played in 2020–21 for Palmer Alma Mediterrànea Palma in the Spanish LEB Gold, averaging 16.1 points and 5.4 rebounds per game.

On August 6, 2021, Harrell signed with Hapoel Gilboa Galil of the Israeli Basketball Premier League.

On August 11, 2022, he signed with MHP Riesen Ludwigsburg of the Basketball Bundesliga (BBL).

On October 11, 2022, he signed with Ironi Ness Ziona of the Israeli Basketball Premier League.

References

External links 
Denver Pioneers bio
Creighton Bluejays bio

1996 births
Living people
American expatriate basketball people in Israel
American expatriate basketball people in Luxembourg
American expatriate basketball people in Romania
American expatriate basketball people in Spain
American men's basketball players
Basketball players from Denver
Creighton Bluejays men's basketball players
Denver Pioneers men's basketball players
Hapoel Gilboa Galil Elyon players
Ironi Nes Ziona B.C. players
Shooting guards
Small forwards